Heartless is the eleventh mixtape by American rapper Moneybagg Yo. It was released on February 14, 2017, by Collective Music Group, Bread Gang Entertainment and N-Less Entertainment. The mixtape features two features by Lil Durk and YFN Lucci. It also features production from JReid, Karltin Bankz, Tay Keith, TK On Da Beat, TM88, Track Gordy and Zaytoven.

Commercial performance
Heartless debuted at number 181 on the US Billboard 200.

Track listing
Credits adapted from Tidal.

Charts

References

2017 mixtape albums
Albums produced by Tay Keith
Albums produced by TM88
Albums produced by Zaytoven
Moneybagg Yo albums